The Unthanks (until 2009 called Rachel Unthank and the Winterset) are an English folk group known for their eclectic approach in combining traditional English folk, particularly Northumbrian folk music, with other musical genres. Their debut album, Cruel Sister, was Mojo magazine's Folk Album of the Year in 2005. Of their subsequent albums, nine have received four or five-starred reviews in the British national press. Their album Mount the Air, released in 2015, won in the best album category in the 2016 BBC Radio 2 Folk Awards. In 2017 they released two albums featuring the songs and poems of Molly Drake, mother of singer-songwriter and musician Nick Drake.

Lines (Parts One, Two & Three), a trilogy of albums about the Hull triple trawler tragedy (1968), the First World War and the poems of Emily Brontë, the principal link between them being their focusing on female perspectives across time, was released in February 2019. Their album, Live and Unaccompanied, was released in March 2020. Their album Sorrows Away was released on 14 October 2022 and received four-starred reviews in The Observer and The Scotsman and a five-starred review in the Financial Times.

Career

Rachel Unthank and the Winterset

Cruel Sister
Originally an all-female band, Rachel Unthank and the Winterset made their debut performance at Holmfirth Folk Festival on 7 May 2004 and launched their debut album Cruel Sister at the same festival venue the following year, on 11 May 2005. Cruel Sister received support from a number of DJs on BBC Radio 2 and was subsequently awarded Folk Album of the Year by Mojo magazine.

The Bairns

Their follow-up album, The Bairns, released on 20 August 2007, was nominated for the Best Album award at the BBC Radio 2 Folk Awards 2008 and was runner-up for the 2008 Mercury Prize. The album debuted in the UK Top 200 Albums Chart at number 178 in the week after the Mercury Prize award ceremony. Reviewing The Bairns for BBC Music, Mel Ledgard described it as "an album with a cinematic quality, huge in dramatic atmosphere". In a four-starred review, Robin Denselow of The Guardian nominated it as "one of the folk records of the year".

The band were nominated for three further BBC Radio 2 Folk Awards in 2008 (Best Band, Best Live Act, Horizon Award), and were successful in one category, receiving the Horizon Award at the ceremony in The Brewery, London.

The Unthanks

Here's the Tender Coming
In 2009, the band became the Unthanks, and their manager Adrian McNally and his childhood friend Chris Price joined the group. Here's the Tender Coming, their third album (and the first under the Unthanks moniker), was released on 14 September 2009. It was Folk Album of the Year for The Guardian and also for Mojo magazine. Sid Smith, of BBC Music, described it as an "astonishing record", "beautiful", "haunting", and "beguiling". In a four-starred review for The Guardian, Colin Irwin said: "This album may not be quite as bleak as The Bairns, and the sound is more sophisticated, but they still sound like nobody else... Tracks build slowly and mysteriously, but all are in service of the song. Their arrangement of the title track − a traditional song about the emotional devastation wrought by press gangs − brilliantly encapsulates the story's fraught desperation. Their version of Nobody Knew She Was There, one of Ewan MacColl's lesser-known songs about his mother, painstakingly paints a similarly dramatic backdrop with more atmospheric brass, and they put their own stamp on the Nic Jones classic, Annachie Gordon."

Last
Their fourth album, Last, was released on 14 March 2011, reaching number 40 in the UK albums chart, and received a five-starred review in the Sunday Express and four-starred reviews in The Guardian and The Daily Telegraph. In his review for the Sunday Express, Martin Townsend proclaimed it "a gorgeously unhurried, utterly mesmerising masterpiece". Thomas H Green of The Daily Telegraph said it was "string-laden and luscious but also delicate, wistful and melancholy". Robin Denselow, for The Guardian, described it as "a bold and highly original set". Sid Smith, for BBC Music, said that "Proving once again that sad songs are very often the best, their fourth album is brimming with material that is as haunting as it is beautiful."

Writing in NME, Anthony Thornton said that the album "proves the mix of Rachel and Becky’s voices to be one of the true wonders of 21st-century music". As well as traditional material, the album included a song written by band member Adrian McNally ("Last"), and versions of songs by Jon Redfern ("Give Away Your Heart"), Tom Waits and Kathleen Brennan ("No One Knows I'm Gone"), King Crimson ("Starless") and Alex Glasgow ("Close the Coalhouse Door").

The Songs of Robert Wyatt and Antony & The Johnsons
In a departure from their usual practice of showcasing material from their studio albums, the Unthanks performed two concerts at London's Union Chapel on 8 and 9 December 2010 consisting entirely of material written by Robert Wyatt and by Antony Hegarty of Antony and the Johnsons. The concerts were recorded, and The Songs of Robert Wyatt and Antony & The Johnsons, a live album based on these recordings, was released on 28 November 2011 to coincide with a UK tour. In a four-starred review, The Observer called the album "A triumphant excursion".

The Unthanks with Brighouse and Rastrick Brass Band
In July 2011, starting with concerts at Durham Cathedral and at London's Barbican Hall, they began a UK tour with the Brighouse and Rastrick Brass Band, performing new brass arrangements of songs from all four Unthanks albums, as well as new material. A live album, based on these concerts, was released in July 2012. In a four-starred review, Robin Denselow of The Guardian described the album as the Unthanks' boldest experiment yet. In a five-starred review, Martin Townsend in the Daily Express said it was "easily the band’s best and most mature album to date". The album was designated Vol. 2 in the Unthanks' Diversions series and followed on from Vol. 1 (The Songs of Robert Wyatt and Antony & The Johnsons).

Songs from the Shipyards
Songs from the Shipyards, Vol. 3 in the Unthanks' Diversions series, was released in November 2012. This is a studio-recorded album of songs from a soundtrack, compiled by the Unthanks, which was first performed live in February 2011 at Newcastle upon Tyne's Tyneside Cinema to accompany the showing of a documentary film by Richard Fenwick about the history of shipbuilding on the Tyne, Wear and Tees. The album includes Elvis Costello's "Shipbuilding" and songs by Graeme Miles, Alex Glasgow, Archie Fisher, John Tams, Peter Bellamy and Jez Lowe, plus a centrepiece track, "The Romantic Tees", written by Adrian McNally. In a four-starred review The Observer'''s Neil Spencer described it as "a stark creation, using little more than piano, violin and voices" but said that its minimalism "lends poignancy to songs and poetry narrating the glory and grime of a vanished era".

Mount the Air
Their album Mount the Air, released in February 2015, received five-starred reviews in The Daily Telegraph and The Irish Times. The Telegraphs reviewer Helen Brown described the album as "a slow, swirling affair that mixes original material with traditional tales. Underpinned by McNally’s cool, fluid piano it’s simultaneously ancient and fresh." Joe Breen, writing in The Irish Times, called it "their most ambitious work" and said that it "places them in the same league as the likes of The Gloaming and the Punch Brothers". In a four-starred review for the Financial Times, David Honigmann said: "Once a bleak Northumbrian chamber folk outfit, the Unthanks have reinvented themselves on a symphonic scale, as witness the 10-minute title track, ushered in on harps and with an orchestration that recalls Gil Evans’s work for Miles Davis." Robin Denselow, in a four-starred review for The Guardian, said: "This is a return to the gentle melancholia of Last, and while there are fine vocals from the Unthank sisters, the dominant figure is Rachel’s husband, Adrian McNally, who plays keyboards and percussion, and produced and wrote much of the music... It’s a lush, often exquisite set". Teddy Jamieson, writing in the Sunday Herald, said: "The Unthanks return with an album that takes the folk tradition the sisters grew up on and sails it into wilder waters... Folk's storytelling tradition is still very much at the heart of this album. But what thrills here is the sense of scale at play in the music, the unrushed, easeful way the musicians stretch into songs, let them linger without ever overstaying their welcome. That and the earthy humanity of the sisters' voices." However, The Observers Neil Spencer bucked the trend, giving the album three stars, and criticising the "ambitious but lumbering orchestration... Two instrumentals eschew the group’s strength; more voices please".

Mount the Air was the winner in the best album category in the 2016 BBC Radio 2 Folk Awards.

Memory Box and Archive Treasures 2005–2015
In December 2015 they released Memory Box, a package containing a new CD, a Christmas 7" single (the first Unthanks single to be issued in this format) and other items to commemorate the band's 10th anniversary. The CD, Archive Treasures 2005–2015, which was also released as a stand-alone item, includes exclusive live tracks, demos and outtakes and BBC session tracks.

The Songs and Poems of Molly Drake
In May 2017 they released two albums, The Songs and Poems of Molly Drake and The Songs and Poems of Molly Drake: Extras, featuring songs written by Molly Drake, mother of Nick Drake. The Songs and Poems of Molly Drake received a five-starred review in The Independent.

Lines
Lines, a trilogy of albums about the 1968 Hull triple trawler tragedy, poetry of the First World War and the poems of Emily Brontë, was pre-released on the band's website in November 2018 and officially released on 22 February 2019. It received a four-starred review in The Guardian.

Live and Unaccompanied
Live and Unaccompanied, released  in March 2020, is an audio CD of 13 songs, sung by Rachel and Becky Unthank and Niopha Keegan without the accompaniment of other members of The Unthanks band. The album was recorded live at various venues in the UK and Ireland in April and May 2019. It  is also packaged in a "Special film edition" which includes a film As We Go, by Ainslie Henderson (who is the partner of band member Becky Unthank), about The Unthanks' life on the road.

The album is designated Vol. 5 in the Unthanks' Diversions series and follows on from Vol. 1 (The Songs of Robert Wyatt and Antony & The Johnsons), released in November 2011, Vol. 2 (The Unthanks with Brighouse and Rastrick Brass Band), released in July 2012, Vol. 3 (Songs from the Shipyards), released in November 2012 and Vol. 4 (The Songs and Poems of Molly Drake), released in May 2017.

Sorrows Away
Their album Sorrows Away was released on 14 October 2022 and received four-starred reviews in The Observer and The Scotsman and a five-starred review in the Financial Times.

Other recordings
The Unthanks performed the title track "Oak, Ash and Thorn" on the 2011 Oak Ash Thorn, a compilation of songs by Rudyard Kipling set to music by Peter Bellamy. The 2012 album Harbour of Songs, produced by Adrian McNally, featured the Unthanks in two songs, "The Ruler" with Nick Hornby and  "Dream of a Tree in a Spanish Graveyard" with Ian MacMillan. The latter track subsequently appeared on the Unthanks' album of archive recordings, Archive Treasures 2005–2015. In 2015, the Unthanks contributed vocals to the song "A Forest" from the album 8:58, a project by Paul Hartnoll.

Becky Unthank and Rachel Unthank are featured on Sting's 2013 album The Last Ship and on Kathryn Tickell's 2016 album Water of Tyne.

Rachel Unthank provided vocals and cello on Simon Haworth's 1998 album Coast to Coast and on his 2003 album Taking Routes. She also played cello on Julian Sutton's 2005 album Melodeon Crimes. Rachel Unthank and Adrian McNally provided backing vocals on Jonny Kearney & Lucy Farrell's 2010 EP The North Farm Sessions and on their 2011 album Kite.

Becky Unthank provided vocals and music boxes on Martin Green's 2014 album Crows' Bones and co-wrote two of the songs. She also sings on Martin Green's 2016 album Flit.

Podcasts
In 2012, Rachel Unthank performed songs in a podcast for The Guardian on Royalty and the English folk song.

Television and radio
On 16 December 2012 (repeated on 4 March 2013), the Unthanks presented A Very English Winter: The Unthanks, a one-hour television programme on BBC Four. This showed the customs that people celebrated on different days of the later autumn and winter, and ended with information about the famous Pancake Race at Olney.

Rachel and Becky Unthank and Adrian McNally hosted an Easter-themed programme that was broadcast on BBC Radio 6 Music on 6 April 2015. It consisted of two hours of music by P J Harvey, Ben Folds, Eliza Carthy, Louis Armstrong and other personal favourites from their own record collections, followed by three hours of BBC archive live music and vintage BBC documentaries.

Series 3 of the BBC Four TV series Detectorists was inspired by Dave Dodds' song "Magpie", as performed by the Unthanks on their album Mount the Air, and the song was played in the first episode of the series.

On 3 August 2018 the group performed at The Proms in Prom 27: Folk Music around Britain and Ireland. Their set included "Magpie", "Gan to the Kye", "Mount the Air" and "The Great Silkie of Sule Skerry".

The Unthanks composed and performed the soundtrack for the 2019 BBC production of Worzel Gummidge, and appeared on screen in the Christmas 2020 episode "Saucy Nancy".

Personal lives
Rachel and Becky Unthank are sisters, born seven and a half years apart, who grew up in Ryton, Tyne and Wear. Rachel graduated from the University of Glasgow with a degree in History and Theatre Studies; Becky studied History of Art and Design at Manchester Metropolitan University. Their father, George Unthank, is an interior designer and a well-known local Northumberland folk singer in a group called The Keelers, named after the boatmen who sailed the Tyne."George Unthank" The Keelers. Retrieved 9 September 2018. Their mother sings in folk choirs.

Rachel was married to, but is now divorced from, group member Adrian McNally. McNally grew up in a mining village near Barnsley, Yorkshire and as well as being a member of the band is also its manager, musical arranger and producer. They have two sons: George, born in 2011; and Arthur, born in 2014.

MembersCurrentRachel Unthank (voice, cello, kalimba, feet)
Becky Unthank (voice, autoharp, feet)
Niopha Keegan (violin, viola, voice)
Adrian McNally (piano, dulcitone, autoharp, marimba, celeste, kalimba, Fender Rhodes piano, chord organ, glockenspiel, Indian harmonium, percussion, voice)
Chris Price (guitar, bass guitar, double bass, ukulele, voice)Former'''
 Belinda O'Hooley (piano, voice)
 Jackie Oates (violin, voice)
 Stef Conner (piano, voice)

Discography

Rachel Unthank and the Winterset

The Unthanks

Various artists

Notes

References

External links

 Official website: The Unthanks

2004 establishments in England
British folk music groups
EMI Records artists
English folk musical groups
Folk music discographies
Musical groups established in 2004
Northumbrian music
Real World Records artists
Rough Trade Records artists